Quercus brenesii is a species of plant in the family Fagaceae. It is endemic to Costa Rica. It is placed in section Lobatae.

References

Endemic flora of Costa Rica
brenesii
Data deficient plants
Taxonomy articles created by Polbot
Taxa named by William Trelease